The Poor Millionaire is a 1930 American silent drama film directed by George Melford and starring Richard Talmadge, Constance Howard and George Irving. Made after the sound film revolution, it was the last Hollywood film to be released without a soundtrack.

Plot
The escaped convict twin brother of a young millionaire, begins to impersonate him and turns his life upside down until he is able to confront him.

Cast
 Richard Talmadge as Sidney Thomas / Putt Magee
 Constance Howard as Babs Long
 George Irving as 	Calvinn Long
 Frederick Vroom as Attorney Wallace
 John Hennings as Peter Cline
 Fanny Midgley as	Mrs. Mansford 
 Jay Hunt as 	Butler

References

Bibliography
 Lopez, David. Films by Genre: 775 Categories, Styles, Trends, and Movements Defined, with a Filmography for Each. McFarland & Company, 1993.

External links
 

1930 films
1930 drama films
1930s English-language films
American silent feature films
Silent American drama films
American black-and-white films
Films directed by George Melford
1930s American films